Oman – Tanzania relations entails the diplomatic relations between Oman and Tanzania. The Sultanate of Oman has one the oldest historical relationship with communities in Tanzania, namely in Zanzibar. Oman is the only country outside Africa where Swahili is spoken as first language and its people have blood relations with people of Tanzania.

History 

Zanzibar, which is a semi-autonomous archipelago in Tanzania has had a relationship with Oman since the 17th century. In 1698, Zanzibar became part of the overseas holdings of Oman after Saif bin Sultan, the Imam of Oman, defeated the Portuguese. In the 1830s, Omani ruler Said bin Sultan moved his court from Muscat to Stone Town. The sultanate controlled large parts of the Tanzanian Mainland coast and continued to trade with inland communities. This led to many Omani people settling in Tanzania. Following the 1964 Zanzibar Revolution, many Omani's were expelled from the islands, however, many still continue to maintain familial relations with family in Oman.

Economic relations 
Trade between the two countries is small. In 2021, trade volume between Tanzania and Oman stood at ~US$ 130m. Tanzania imported goods worth ~US$ 105m, while its exports stood at ~US$ 25m. Tanzania imports from Oman are mostly oil derivatives products such as plastics, while exports are mostly meat & foodstuffs.

Oman Air has direct connections between Muscat and Dar es Salaam/Zanzibar.

Diplomatic Relations 
Both countries have established diplomatic missions in each respective countries and have various co-operative agreements between them in Trade, Politics, Higher education and most importantly cooperation in records and archives.

High level State Visits 
 October 2012 - Jakaya Kikwete, President of Tanzania made a state visit to Oman.
 June 2022 - Samia Suluhu Hassan, President of Tanzania made a state visit to Oman.
 October 2022 - Hussein Mwinyi, President of Zanzibar made a state visit to Oman.

Resident diplomatic missions 
 Oman has an embassy in Dar es Salaam and a Consulate in Zanzibar City.
 Tanzania has an embassy in Muscat.

References

External links 

Oman
Bilateral relations of Oman